The Coalition of Hope Foundation, Inc. (COH) is a US-based 501(c)(3), not-for-profit, charitable organization that provides global humanitarian assistance and disaster-relief support. COH was founded by Timothy J. Keegan in 2010.

The Coalition's primary goal is Project Excelsior, a plan to utilize recently decommissioned Tarawa-class amphibious assault ships as its primary operations platforms. These vessels, referred to as a humanitarian assistance disaster relief vessels (HADR/V), will serve as a sea-based platform for conducting humanitarian assistance disaster relief (HADR) operations.

Operations

2021 Afghan Rescue Operations 
As of 24 August 2021, the Coalition of Hope had airlifted 27 Afghan citizens out of Hamid Karzai International Airport in Kabul.  Coalition of Hope Foundation functions as a vetted and approved NGO by multiple US Government agencies, including the US Department of State and Department of Defense. COH is as an authorized facilitator of humanitarian relief and evacuations, according to a 24 August 21 Catholic Herald Tribune online article.

2012 Hurricane Sandy 
In October 2012 Hurricane Sandy devastated the US Northeast.  The Coalition of Hope Foundation partnered with Catholic Relief and focused on providing assistance to residents of Rockaway Beach, Long Island, NY. A fundraising concert to benefit Rockaway Relief featuring 'Celtic Thunder' was sponsored by Coalition of Hope on 3 December 2012

Coalition of Hope also began a mold-remediation program in partnership with TruPro Restoration of Spring Brook Township, PA.  Coalition of Hope Foundation ended its involvement with Hurricane Sandy relief operations in June 2013.  On 18 June, CoH held a "Post Superstorm Sandy Rebuilding Resources Conference" at the Museum of Modern Art, Rockaway New York.  This conference served to close out CoH's involvement in relief operations and provide the remaining stakeholders a forum to discuss best practices and lessons learned.

2010 Haiti earthquake 
The Coalition of Hope Foundation was active in relief operations to Haiti after the January 2010 earthquake. Foundation CEO Tim Keegan solicited corporations for donations of relief materials, and corporate sponsors responded and donated an estimated 1.2 million pounds of supplies for Haiti relief operations. Keegan worked with Operation Big Heart Brigade and the 143rd Expeditionary Sustainment Command (ESC) to transport the donated supplies to Haiti from the Florida collection-point at Opa-Locka Airport in Miami FL.

Project Excelsior
The Coalition of Hope Foundation's Project Excelsior focuses on acquiring decommissioned U.S. Navy assault carriers (LHA) and rebuilding them as dedicated HADR/V vessels.

In response to the 2010 earthquake which devastated Haiti, the U.S. sent the USNS Comfort (T-AH-20) as a relief operation.  USNS Comfort, and her sister USNS Mercy (T-AH-19), are converted oil tankers and were designed to serve as floating hospitals for USN carrier groups.  In the Haiti mission, USNS Comfort proved to have shortcomings in disaster relief operations.  The two major shortcoming were the vessel's speed (17.5 knots) and patient transfer capability.

Patient transfer to USNS Comfort is hampered by a small flight deck, with space for only two CH53 Sea Stallions, and hull access from the waterline via a two story external ladder.  In comparison, the Tarawa-class amphibious assault ships have 11 landing zones for rotary wing aircraft, and a well-deck at the rear of the vessel for launching and receiving amphibious vehicles headed to and from shorelines.  Additionally, Tarawa-class LHA's draft is two meters less than either the USNS Mercy or USNS Comfort, enabling a shorter stand-off distance from shorelines.  Said CEO Tim Keegan, "These vessels were designed to put men and machines on shore as quickly as possible, we want to use these platforms for doing the same in reverse"

The United States Government last released a former US Navy vessel for humanitarian missions in 1960.  From 1960 through 1974, the People to People Health Foundation operated the former  as the SS HOPE, cruising to bring medical relief to underdeveloped areas of the world, including South Vietnam, Peru, Ecuador, Guinea, Nicaragua, Colombia, Sri Lanka, Tunisia, Jamaica, and Brazil.

Recent media coverage
Catholic Herald "American Catholic Leading Relief Efforts to Evacuate Afghan Refugees" August 2021

Washington Life Magazine "40,000 Tons of Hope: Coalition of Hope's bold new approach to humanitarian assistance operations" December 2019

Tallahassee Democrat "An FSU grad's big plan: Acquire a retired Navy ship to respond to humanitarian crises" September 2018

Defense Update "Navy Asked to Donate Ex. USS Nassau to Support Humanitarian Relief Worldwide" November 2013.

Rock Thiz Magazine and The Pulse Magazine both ran feature stories about CoH and Project Excelsior in April 2014.

References

External links

Emergency organizations